Aleksander Dominik Kłak (born 24 November 1970) is a retired Polish football player. Kłak was a participant at the 1992 Summer Olympics, where Poland won the silver medal.

After retiring from playing due to ongoing injury problems, he became a goalkeeping coach at Royal Antwerp and a bus driver for the Antwerp public transportation network.

He also battled clinical depression after retirement, and says his recovery was aided, among others, by the help of the  Capucin monks and his subsequent rediscovery of his faith.

References

External links
 

1970 births
Living people
Polish footballers
Olympic footballers of Poland
Olympic silver medalists for Poland
Expatriate footballers in Germany
Expatriate footballers in Belgium
Expatriate footballers in the Netherlands
Polish expatriate footballers
Górnik Zabrze players
Royal Antwerp F.C. players
De Graafschap players
FC 08 Homburg players
Bonner SC players
F.C.V. Dender E.H. players
Footballers at the 1992 Summer Olympics
Ekstraklasa players
Belgian Pro League players
Olympic medalists in football
Sportspeople from Nowy Sącz
Medalists at the 1992 Summer Olympics
Association football goalkeepers
SV 19 Straelen players
Poland international footballers
Bus drivers